Puposyrnola basistriata is a species of sea snail, a marine gastropod mollusk in the family Pyramidellidae, the pyrams and their allies. Can be found in the Northern part of the Gulf of Thailand.

References

External links
 To World Register of Marine Species

Pyramidellidae
Gastropods described in 2004